The Watchdogs are a fictional right-wing terrorist group appearing in American comic books published by Marvel Comics, usually as enemies of Captain America.

The Watchdogs have also been adapted into other media, having appeared in the TV series Agents of S.H.I.E.L.D. and the video game Marvel's Avengers.

Publication history 
The Watchdogs first appeared in Captain America #335 (Nov 1987) and were created by writer Mark Gruenwald and artist Tom Morgan.

Most of the villains Mark Gruenwald introduced in Captain America were created to symbolize aspects of contemporary American culture and the world political situation. In the case of the Watchdogs, Gruenwald created them to symbolize censorship and repression.

Philosophy, goals, and activities 
The Watchdogs are dedicated to restoring and preserving traditional American culture and values, and fighting against indecency, immorality, and sexual perversion. The Watchdogs seek to impose their conservative moral views on the general public; they believe in strict enforcement of family values, and are violently opposed to pornography, obscenity, sex education, abortion, homosexuality, and the teaching of evolutionary theory. Their terrorist activities, which include vandalism, arson, intimidation, assault, kidnapping, brainwashing, and murder, are targeted primarily at people who produce material which the Watchdogs consider pornographic, including nude art and sexually explicit music.

The Watchdogs are active in Georgia, Alabama, Mississippi, Tennessee, West Virginia, Missouri, plus Washington, D.C. and New York City. The Watchdogs imprison their kidnapping victims at a large compound in Vermont, where they force them to wear "dog collars" which the Watchdogs use to administer a painful electric shock as punishment for undesirable behavior. The prisoners are forced to participate in group activities such as sing-alongs, and exposed to constant televised Americana imagery such as baseball games, American flags, fields of flowers, and happy children.

Organization 
The Watchdogs are headed by a leader referred to as Watchdog Prime (real name unknown), also called Watchdog One or Top Dog. Each state ("realm") is governed by a Head Dog. Each realm has one or more operating units ("packs"). Individual cells of Watchdogs, called "dogpounds," are organized by city and led by "pack leaders." Members call one another Dog-Brothers. Unbeknownst to nearly all of its membership, the Watchdogs were partially funded by the Red Skull through his dummy corporation, the Freedom Foundations; the Watchdogs receive the rest of their funding through public contributors and other undisclosed financiers. Watchdog Prime held the position of one of the Red Skull's "division chiefs," and the Red Skull saw in them an opportunity to harm America by creating chaos. Whether Watchdog Prime was deceived by the Skull or was secretly working against that which he claimed to uphold is unknown.

The Watchdogs use conventional technology, with all weapons and paraphernalia purchased from legitimate retailers; members use their own ground vehicles, usually pick up trucks, vans, motorcycles, and recreational vehicles. The Watchdogs wear identical costumes of synthetic stretch fabric resembling riot gear, consisting of tight-fighting purple shirts and pants with gold-colored gloves, leather boots and accessories, armored kevlar vests, and hard plastic helmets with built-in visors. They are trained in the use of firearms, and usually arm themselves with conventional American-manufactured handguns, shotguns, and rifles, and Army surplus explosives. Watchdogs also carry Army surplus walkie-talkies, and short-wave radios. The Red Skull denies Watchdog Prime's request for funding to purchase exotic weaponry, because use of such weapons would undermine the group's image as a grassroots organization.

A Watchdog member must be an adult male over 21 with a valid gun permit willing to sign an affidavit in blood that he is not a homosexual, believes in the Bible and the United States Constitution, disavows all immoral acts, and is willing to use violence to oppose all activities, materials, institutions, and individuals which are deemed by the organization to undermine the morality and decency of the United States.

Fictional team biography 
The Watchdogs were introduced as the first group fought by John Walker and Lemar Hoskins after officially becoming the new Captain America and Bucky, respectively. A major Watchdog pack torches an adult bookstore and women's health clinic, and attempts to lynch an alleged pornographer. This pack is busted by John Walker, as the interim Captain America, who was initially conflicted in his opposition to the Watchdogs because he shared their political views. The Watchdogs later hold Walker's parents captive in an effort to get revenge upon him; during the ensuing melee, the Watchdogs murdered his parents, and Walker became a bitter enemy of the organization. The Red Skull was seen to have employed a single Watchdog in his elite cadre of bodyguards.

At the public ceremony where Walker relinquished his title of Captain America to Rogers, a lone Watchdog shot and apparently killed Walker. In the same issue, an unnamed member of the Watchdogs was killed by Scourge of the Underworld disguised as a government agent. The "Watchdog" was actually a government agent who staged the ruse on John Walker's behalf so that he can re-emerge as the U.S. Agent. As Captain America, Rogers continued to oppose the Watchdogs, especially once they kidnapped his then-girlfriend Bernie Rosenthal.

Although he and U.S. Agent arrested all the Watchdogs at the Vermont compound, the organization was apparently still active by Captain America #394, when Watchdog Prime joined his fellow division chiefs in a meeting with the Red Skull. At the time, they were expanding their operations and membership westward across the United States.

Other versions 
In the Ultimate Marvel universe, the Watchdogs are a terrorist hate group that were killed by Scourge.

In other media

Television 
 The Watchdogs appear in live-action media set in the Marvel Cinematic Universe. This version of the group is a radical Inhuman-hunting group, initially led by ex-S.H.I.E.L.D. Agent Felix Blake using a wheelchair and secretly supported by Hydra. 
 The group first appear in the television series Agents of S.H.I.E.L.D. Introduced in their self-titled, season three episode, they attack an Advanced Threat Containment Unit (ATCU) facility. In season four episode "Uprising", the Watchdogs, now backed by anti-Inhuman senator Ellen Nadeer, use an EMP device to shut down power in various cities holding Inhumans to halt Inhuman registration, but their plans are foiled by S.H.I.E.L.D. agents Mack, Phil Coulson, Elena "Yo-Yo" Rodriguez, and Leo Fitz. In the episode "Broken Promises", Nadeer orders a group of Watchdogs to guard her while she attends to her Inhuman brother, Vijay. However, S.H.I.E.L.D. agents Daisy Johnson, Jeffrey Mace, and Jemma Simmons confront Nadeer and defeat the Watchdogs, though the senator escapes and kills Vijay before meeting with the Watchdog Superior, Anton Ivanov. In the episode "BOOM", Watchdog Tucker Shockley is exposed to Terrigen gas and turns into an explosive Inhuman, killing Nadeer. In response to this, Ivanov arranges for S.H.I.E.L.D. to capture Shockley while the former and the Watchdogs capture Mace. In the episode "The Man Behind the Shield", Ivanov confronts Coulson and Johnson, only to be buried alive by the latter. In the episode "Self-Control", the android AIDA converts Ivanov into an LMD and places his head in a jar to coerce him into helping her steal the Darkhold and protect her Framework. In the episode "The Return", Ivanov receives multiple robotic copies of himself that he can control mentally. In the season five episode "The Devil Complex", Hydra agent General Hale locates Ivanov's head and coerces him into working for her so they can save Earth from Thanos. In the episode "The Honeymoon", Ivanov attempts to defend a Hydra facility from Rodriquez, only to killed by her while his robotic soldiers are deactivated upon his death. Ivanov and the Watchdogs also make minor appearances throughout the series, with the episode "Lockup", revealing that they recruit new members from prisons.
 The Watchdogs appear in the companion web series Agents of S.H.I.E.L.D.: Slingshot. In the episode "Deal Breaker", former National Police of Colombia member turned arms dealer Victor Ramon escapes from prison and joins forces with the Watchdogs to help them eliminate Inhumans and capture Rodriguez. In the episode "Justicia" however, the Watchdogs' Alpha Dog accidentally kills Ramon while the rest are defeated by S.H.I.E.L.D.

Video games 
The Watchdogs appear in the 2020 video game Marvel's Avengers. This version of the group originated as a vigilante group who captured and eliminated Inhumans, but slowly turned into hired guns for A.I.M. and come into conflict with the Avengers. They also utilize advanced weaponry such as flamethrowers, riot shields, and jet packs.

References

External links 
 Watchdogs at Marvel Wiki
 Watchdogs at Comic Vine
 The Watchdogs at Bring on the Bad Guys

Characters created by Mark Gruenwald
Comic book terrorist organizations
Comics characters introduced in 1987
Fictional organizations in Marvel Comics